Rain Song (انشودة المطر “Unshūdat almaṭar”) is a famous 1960 poetry collection and Arabic poem by Badr Shakir al-Sayyab One of the "great poems in modern Arabic poetry", it has been compared to T.S. Eliot's The Waste Land.

Song 
The poem was set to music by Saudi singer and composer Mohammed Abdu in 1992.

References

1960 poems
1960 poetry books
Iraqi poetry